Belweder (from the Italian belvedere, "beautiful view") is a neoclassical palace in Warsaw, Poland. Erected in 1660 and remodelled in the early 1800s, it is one of several official residences used by Polish presidents as well as a state guest house for visiting heads of state. The complex is situated south of Warsaw's city center, in the vicinity of the historic Royal Baths Park (Łazienki).

History
The present building is the latest of several that stood on the site since 1660. Belweder once belonged to Poland's last king, Stanislaus Augustus, who used it as a porcelain-manufacturing plant. From 1818 it was the residence of Grand Duke Constantine Pavlovich, who de facto acted as viceroy in the Congress Kingdom of Poland. He fled from Belweder at the beginning of the November 1830 Uprising.

After the re-establishment of Poland's independence following the First World War (1918), Belweder served as the residence of Marshal Józef Piłsudski, Chief of State (1918–22) and later (1926–35) Minister of Military Affairs of Poland. Intermittently, it was also the residence of President Stanisław Wojciechowski. After the May 1926 coup d'état, the ownership of the complex had passed from Wojciechowski to Piłsudski, who died there in 1935.

During World War II, the building was extensively remodelled for Hans Frank, Governor of Nazi-occupied Poland and the so-called General Government. It remains one of the few original structures in Warsaw to survive the war.

In 1945-1952 it was the residence of Bolesław Bierut, and later of the president of the Council of State. From 1989 to July 1994, it was the official residence of Poland's presidents (Wojciech Jaruzelski and Lech Wałęsa), but proved too small for that purpose. Later on president Bronisław Komorowski used it as his private residence.
 
Belweder is normally used by the President and the government for ceremonial purposes, while the President resides at the "Presidential Palace" in the city center. It also serves as an official residence for heads of state on official visits to Poland and other important guests. There have been plans to turn the Belweder Palace into a museum dedicated to Józef Piłsudski. Currently it houses a small exhibition devoted to the Marshal.

Gallery

See also
 Royal Route
 Presidential Palace
 Polish classicism
 Belvedere Vodka - a brand named after the palace, which is depicted on its label

References

External links

 Belweder, or the Polish road to independence

1822 establishments in Poland
Houses completed in 1822
Neoclassical architecture in Warsaw
Official residences in Poland
Palaces in Warsaw
Royal residences in Poland
Presidential residences
State guesthouses